This is a list of alumina refineries in the world. The list is incomplete and missing some data.

Smelter-grade alumina refineries

Specialty alumina plants

See also
List of aluminium smelters

References

Sources
 Alcan, (2006). An Evolving Alcan: Alcan Facts 2006, Canada: Alcan.
 Platt's Metal Week, 27 October 1997, p. 6
 Plunkert, P (1997). Bauxite and Alumina, United States Geological Survey
 Hydro Aluminium, (2004). Shaping Solutions for the Future, Oslo: Hydro Media.
 United Nations, (2000). United Nations Conference on Trade and Development: Recent and Planned Changes in Production Capacity for Bauxite, Alumina and Aluminium

Alumina refineries
Refineries, alumina
ι